The Federation of Dutch Trade Unions (FNV) is a national trade union centre in the Netherlands.  In addition to member unions, workers in many sectors can join the FNV directly.

History
The FNV was founded in 1976 from the merger of the Dutch Catholic Trade Union Federation (NKV) and the social-democratic Dutch Confederation of Trade Unions (NVV). The Protestant Christian National Trade Union Federation (CNV) originally also participated in the talks, but it refused to fully merge into a new union.  The federation was founded because of declining membership, due to depillarisation and increasing political polarisation between left and right.  The first president of the FNV was Wim Kok, who had been chair of NVV since 1973.  He remained its leader until 1986, when he entered parliament for the Dutch Labour Party.  The NKV and the NVV dissolved themselves into the FNV at the start of 1982.

The FNV was crucial in the economic recovery in the Netherlands during the 1980s. It supported the so-called Wassenaar Agreement, where employee accepted lower wages in exchange for more employment. During the 1990s the FNV came into a heavy conflict over reforms of the WAO, the disabled act, with the cabinet Lubbers-III, in which the party's former chair, Kok, was vice-prime minister. The proposals were consequently dropped.

In the 2000s the FNV came into conflict with the Second Balkenende cabinet over the AOW, the old aged act, and the WAO, the disabilities act. A huge protest was organized in Amsterdam in 2004. The FNV became a leading member in "Keer het Tij" (Turn the Tide) an alliance of social organizations that opposed the cabinet and became involved in organizing the Dutch Social Forum, the Dutch branch of the World Social Forum in 2004 and 2006.

In 2012 the FNV almost split due to a conflict between the more radical wing and the moderates on the issue of pensions. The split was averted, but led to a complete overhaul of the organizational model of the FNV. In late 2014, the largest three affiliates of the FNV, the Allied Union, Construction and Wood Union, and Abvakabo, dissolved into the federation.

Ideology
The FNV started out as a neutral union but has a strong social-democratic orientation and strong links with the social-democratic PvdA. It is critical of both government and employers, but is also heavily incorporated in the Dutch pillarist (corporatist) system. Compared to the CNV, the other major trade union centre, the FNV is more leftwing and has more often used strikes, although the use of these actions is rare in the Netherlands in comparison to other European countries.

Although the FNV is formally independent of other organizations there are strong ideological and personal links with the social-democratic PvdA in what is known as the pillarisation. Former FNV chair Wim Kok served as Prime Minister of the Netherlands, between 1994 and 2002. Politicians from other Dutch parties also have their background in FNV, former leader of the Dutch GreenLeft Paul Rosenmöller was one of the leaders of the FNV in the Rotterdam harbours.

Activities
The most important function of FNV are the collective bargaining negotiations, on wages and secondary working conditions, it holds with the employers' federations. It also advises government through the Social Economic Council in which other trade unions, employers' organizations and government appointed experts also have seats. FNV also helps members individually when legal action is required. Lawyers of the FNV help members with questions about employment law, pensions, occupational diseases, personal injury, debt collection processes and social security.

Organisation
The FNV is both a labour union (consisting of different sectors) as well as a labour federation (with affiliated independent unions). Both these sectors and affiliated unions are represented in the FNV parliament, which is directly elected by the membership. The number of seats per sector/affiliated union is determined by their membership in proportion to the total membership of the FNV. The parliament represents the membership, creates "overarching" policy and oversees the board. The parliament also elects the board (except the chairman, who is directly elected by the membership). The current chairman is Tuur Elzinga.

Sectors

Affiliates

Current affiliates

Former affiliates

Presidents
1976: Wim Kok
1986: Hans Pont
1988: Johan Stekelenburg
1997: Lodewijk de Waal
2005: Agnes Jongerius
2012: Ton Heerts
2017: Han Busker
2021: Tuur Elzinga

References

External links
 FNV trade union central site

Trade unions in the Netherlands
International Trade Union Confederation
European Trade Union Confederation
Trade unions established in 1976
National trade union centers of the Netherlands